Tubbs is a surname. Notable people with the surname include::
 Alfred L. Tubbs, American businessman
 Billy Tubbs, American college basketball coach.
 F. Eugene Tubbs, American politician.
 Greg Tubbs, American Major League Baseball player.
 Hubert Tubbs, American singer with Tower of Power and as solo act
 Irl Tubbs, American college football coach.
 James Tubbs, British instrument bow-maker.
 Jerry Tubbs, American football linebacker.
 Marcus Tubbs, American football defensive tackle.
 Matt Tubbs, English footballer.
 Pierre Tubbs, British songwriter and music producer.
 Ralph Tubbs, British architect.
 Steffan Tubbs, American radio host.
 Stephanie Tubbs Jones, Member of the US House of Representatives from Ohio
 Tony Tubbs, American Boxing Heavyweight champion.
 Winfred Tubbs, American football player.
 Zac Tubbs, American football offensive tackle.

Fictional characters:
 A character in The League of Gentlemen (comedy)
 Ricardo Tubbs, a character detective in Miami Vice
 Calhoun Tubbs a character on the show In Living Color

See also 
 Wash Tubbs the name of a comic strip
 Tubbs Fire, large wildfire in Northern California, October 2017

References 

English-language surnames